Jebel Chitana-Cap Negro national Park is a national park situated on the north coast of Tunisia, between the cap Serrat and the Sidi el Barrak Dam. It consists of the forest chain of Jebel Chitana, within forest district of Bizerte, and that of Bellif, dependent on the forest district of Béja.

References 

Protected areas established in 2010
IUCN Category II
National parks of Tunisia